Two languages were formerly known as Ostyak:

Khanty language
Ket language